United Nations Security Council resolution 1253, adopted without a vote on 28 July 1999, after examining the application of the Kingdom of Tonga for membership in the United Nations, the Council recommended to the General Assembly that Tonga be admitted, bringing total membership of the United Nations to 188.

See also
 Enlargement of the United Nations
 Member states of the United Nations
 List of United Nations Security Council Resolutions 1201 to 1300 (1998–2000)

References

External links
 
Text of the Resolution at undocs.org

 1253
 1253
 1253
1999 in Tonga
July 1999 events